Solomon Kwabena Sarfoh is a Ghanaian politician and a former member of parliament  for the Mampong constituency of the Ashanti Region of Ghana. He was a member of the 3rd parliament and a former chairman of the parliament select committee for roads and transport.

Early life and  Education 
Sarfoh was born in Mampong, a town in the Ashanti Region of Ghana.

Politics 
Sarfoh was first elected into Parliament on the ticket of the New Patriotic Party during the December 2996 Ghanaian Elections. He polled 21,183 votes out of the 29,385 valid votes cast representing 59.50% against Elizabeth Nico a lNDC member who polled 8,202 votes representing 23.00%.

Sarfoh was a member of the 2nd and 3rd parliament of the 4th republic of Ghana and a politician of the New Patriotic Party. He was elected as a member of parliament for the mampong constituency during the 2000 Ghanaian general election with 21,183 votes. He retained his seat in the 2000 general elections with a total of 23,352 making 74.30% of the total valid  votes cast that year.

He lost the seat in the  2004 delegate elections to Peter Abum Sarkodie of the same party. He was later appointed me as the chairman  for the parliamentary select committee for road and transport.

References 

Ghanaian MPs 2001–2005
Living people
New Patriotic Party politicians
21st-century Ghanaian politicians
People from Ashanti Region
Ghanaian MPs 1997–2001
Year of birth missing (living people)